Paedophryne (from the Ancient Greek paedos (παίδος) "child" and phryne (φρύνος) "toad, frog") is a genus of microhylid frogs from Papua New Guinea, including D'Entrecasteaux Islands. All seven species known so far are amongst the smallest frog and vertebrate species.

Species
The following species are recognised in the genus Paedophryne:
 Paedophryne amauensis Rittmeyer et al., 2012
 Paedophryne dekot Kraus, 2011
 Paedophryne kathismaphlox Kraus, 2010
 Paedophryne oyatabu Kraus, 2010
 Paedophryne swiftorum Rittmeyer et al., 2012
 Paedophryne titan Kraus, 2015
 Paedophryne verrucosa Kraus, 2011

Gallery

Footnotes

Microhylidae
Amphibians of New Guinea
Amphibian genera